The French National Institute of Public Service [Institut national du service public - INSP], created on January 1, 2022, is the new public benchmark dedicated to the recruitment, initial training, and continuing training of French top executives and managers.  

Its creation is part of the top management reforms introduced by French President Emmanuel Macron, in order to achieve a more efficient, inclusive and attractive top administration.

The Institute is responsible for providing senior state executives with initial and continuing training based on new foundations. It oversees a common core program for public service schools that train senior executives from all three sectors of the public service and the administration of justice, to ensure common references, improve public action and then better serve French citizens.

It especially provides continuing training that focuses on helping senior civil servants access government management positions.

The Institute's mission, as a prestigious training centre for top executives and managers, is to build top-quality academic partnerships (in France and abroad) and to develop France's international influence, which includes taking foreign students and welcoming foreign auditors.

The INSP is seated in Strasbourg and has offices in Paris.

Its structure and activities are set out in Decree no. 2021-1556 of December 1, 2021.

Objectives of the INSP 
The Institute's main objectives are to: 

 Organize preparation courses for the entrance exams to the senior civil service and European organizations;
 Organize the Institute’s entrance exams;
 Ensure the initial training of civil servant students who have passed the entrance exams, in conjunction with other public service schools or ministries' training departments;
 Oversee and coordinate courses which aim to develop a common culture in public action and to open up the administration. These courses will be designed in conjunction with other public service schools, ministries' training departments or organizations in charge of continuing education;
 Implement a range of continuing professional and top-quality training - often resulting in a diploma or certification - intended for people working or likely to work as government executives or for those wishing to access management positions;
 Carry out and fund research activities related to public services;
 Enhance the influence of the French administration's research, training, and expertise in Europe and worldwide.

History 
Emmanuel Macron decided to suppress definitely the École nationale d'administration despite the opposition of his Prime Minister Édouard Philippe and of his Private secretary Benoît Ribadeau-Dumas (who both, like Emmanuel Macron, went to ENA)

Upon his announcement, this decision was critiqued by many French "Hauts fonctionnaires" ('senior civil servant'), many of whom attended the ÉNA themselves.

Recruitment 
Students are selected after a bachelor's degree with different competitions depending on the candidate's profile.

References 

Grandes écoles
French public administration schools
Educational institutions established in 2021
2021 establishments in France
Emmanuel Macron
Education in Strasbourg
Education in Paris